Ssukh (translation: Happiness)  is a 2005 Bollywood comedy film directed by Kirti Ahuja starring his brother Govinda, Preeti Jhangiani, Chunky Pandey, Aarti Chhabria and Jackie Shroff. The film was also produced by Govinda.

Cast
Govinda as Chandraprakash Sharma 
Preeti Jhangiani as Sushila Chandraprakash Sharma 
Chunky Pandey as Rakesh Verma 
Aarti Chhabria as Bhavna Rakesh Verma 
Jackie Shroff as Gaurishankar Yadav 
Mahesh Anand as Advocate Khalil Sheikh 
Rana Jung Bahadur as Patwardhan 
Prem Chopra as Judge 
Avtar Gill as Private Eye 
Pratima Kazmi as Bhavna's sister-in-law 
Sharat Saxena as Bhavna's brother

Music
Aawajo Aawajo - Kumar Sanu
Dar Kahe Ko Re - Shreya Ghoshal, Udit Narayan
O Pran Piya - Jaspinder Narula
Ssukh Hai Mere - Udit Narayan
Suno Rato Me Kya - Udit Narayan, Alka Yagnik
Shola Badan - Sadhana Sargam

Reception
Patcy N of Rediff.com wrote: "Ssukh is supposed to be a family entertainer. But watching it was so painful that it should be renamed to Dukh." Taran Adarsh of Bollywood Hungama gave the film 1 star out of 5, writing: "On the whole, Ssukh stands on a weak foundation [script] and that will prove to be its downfall."

References

External links 
 

2000s Hindi-language films
2005 films
2005 comedy films
Indian comedy films
Hindi-language comedy films